Kirkmichael is a parish and hamlet in Moray, Scotland. Kirkmichael was historically part of Banffshire.

The hamlet lies approximately 8 miles south of Ballindalloch and 6 miles north-west of Tomintoul. Tomintoul Distillery is located in the parish.

The local church, St Michael's (Kirkmichael), from which the parish takes its name is located just south of the hamlet. The church and burial ground are Category C listed. The church in its current rectangle form dates to 1807 but was substantially repaired in 1951 following a fire. A chapel existed before the current church but the exact position is unknown. There is an historic stone cross in the churchyard known as St Michael's Cross.

There are several listed buildings in the Kirkmichael parish. One notable example is the Category A listed mid-18th century Ballantruan Farm, located near the Tomintoul distillery. The Ballantruan woodlands lie to the east of the farm.

The parish and hamlet lie along the River Avon and the B9136 road.

References

Villages in Moray